Urban Romantic (typeset as URBAN ROMANTIC) is J-Pop singer Rie fu's fourth album, released April 8, 2009. It spent three weeks on the Oricon album chart, peaking at number 30 on April 20, 2009.

Track listing 
Something In My Head 
Sunny Days 
Hey I'm Calling Up
ビジネス (Bijinesu, Business)
あなたを想えばあふれる涙 (Anata wo Omoeba Afureru Namida)
Romantic
Drummy.
She Can't Say No (ノーと言えない女) (No to Ienai Onna)
Money Will Love You (English version)
いつかこの道の先に (All The Way) (Itsuka Kono Michi no Saki ni)
Present
Suki
Romantic (strings version)

References

2009 albums
Rie fu albums